Justa Morris Lindgren (July 28, 1878 – May 29, 1951) was an American football player and coach.  He served as head football coach at Cornell College in Mount Vernon, Iowa from 1902 to 1903 and at the University of Illinois at Urbana–Champaign in 1904—along with Arthur R. Hall, Fred Lowenthal, and Clyde Matthews—and alone in 1906, compiling a record of 14–16–2.  Lindgren played football at Illinois from 1898 to 1901 and was the captain of the 1901 team.  In addition to his two stints as a head coach, he served a line coach for the team until 1943.

Lindgren was also a chemist.  He served on the chemistry staff at the University of Illinois and was an analyst for the Illinois Geological Survey and the State Water Survey.

Head coaching record

References

External links

1878 births
1951 deaths
19th-century players of American football
Cornell Rams football coaches
Illinois Fighting Illini football coaches
Illinois Fighting Illini football players
University of Illinois Urbana-Champaign faculty